The Bendora Dam is a thin-wall, double curvature concrete arch dam across the upper reaches of the Cotter River, located within Namadgi National Park in the Australian Capital Territory, Australia. The impounded reservoir is called the Bendora Reservoir which is a supply source of potable water for the city of Canberra and its environs.

Location and features
Constructed by E S Clementson working from designs prepared by the Commonwealth Department of Works, the Bendora Dam was completed and opened in 1961 and was the first dam of its type built in Australia.

Water from the Bendora, together with the Corin (further upstream), is fed to the suburbs of Canberra via the Bendora Gravity Main.

See also

 Cotter Dam
 Corin Dam
List of dams and reservoirs in the Australian Capital Territory

References

External links

 

Dams in the Australian Capital Territory
Dams completed in 1961
1961 establishments in Australia
Arch dams
Murray-Darling basin